Robert Bruce Stuart, Duke of Kintyre and Lorne (18 January 1602 – 27 May 1602) was the fifth child of James VI of Scotland and Anne of Denmark. He was born at Dunfermline Palace, Fife.  On 2 May 1602 he was created Duke of Kintyre and Lorne, Marquess of Wigton, Earl of Carrick and Lord of Annandale. He died at Dunfermline Palace on 27 May 1602 and was buried at Holyrood Abbey.

His older siblings included Henry Frederick, Prince of Wales, Elizabeth, and Charles.

Robert's birth was attended by the physicians Martin Schöner and John Naysmyth and the midwife Janet Kinloch. He was born at 1 o'clock in the morning. The page John Murray brought news of the birth to the king, who was staying at Edinburgh, and had set out to visit the queen. Edinburgh Castle gave a cannon salute. James VI gave Anne of Denmark a gift of a pointed diamond. Robert's nurse Isobel Colt was dressed in black velvet. The baptism was delayed longer than usual. It was widely believed that Prince Henry would be godfather and after the baptism he would stay at Dunfermline Palace with his mother, but this did not come to be, despite the king's promise.

On 2 May 1602 Robert was carried from Dunfermline Palace into the Abbey by the Duke of Lennox on a large purple cushion for his baptism. His name and titles were proclaimed by trumpeters at the windows of the abbey, and the celebrations involved a tournament of "running at ring" which damaged a cornfield. The sum of £66-13s-4d Scots was thrown into the crowd as largesse. On the previous day an English Catholic, Humphrey Dethick, either the son of a London baker or from Ashbourne, Derbyshire, killed one of the guests, claiming to be acting to fulfil a prophecy told to him in Spain.

Margaret Stewart, Mistress of Ochiltree, the senior lady in waiting, was in charge of Robert's care. Marion Hepburn was appointed to rock Robert's cradle. Isobel Colt, the nurse, was the wife of Patrick Smith, an Edinburgh lawyer and writer to the signet. She was dismissed shortly before the death of Duke Robert, as it was thought a new nurse would improve his health. Isobel was given £200 Scots as a reward for her service by the English courtier Roger Aston on 25 May. The payment was witnessed by John Buchanan, who later married Margaret Hartsyde, a servant of the queen.

When Robert was ill and Princess Elizabeth at Linlithgow Palace was sick with the measles, Anne of Denmark was "sorrowful and more than ever she was before", but she told James, "If it please God to take one of our children, He will send us another, for I feel myself with child."

David Calderwood wrote that Doctor Hereis got little thanks for his care of the prince.

References

1602 births
1602 deaths
17th-century Scottish peers
Robert
Stuart, Robert Duke Of Kintyre
Dukes in the Peerage of Scotland
Peers of Scotland created by James VI
People from Dunfermline
Earls or mormaers of Carrick
Children of James VI and I
Royalty and nobility who died as children
Sons of kings